Mănăstirea may refer to several places in Romania:

Mânăstirea, a commune in Călărași County
 Mănăstirea, a village in Pătârlagele town, Buzău County
 Mănăstirea, a village in Mica Commune, Cluj County
 Mănăstirea, a village in Cobia Commune, Dâmbovița County
 Mănăstirea, a village in Crevedia Commune, Dâmbovița County
 Mănăstirea, a village in Dagâța Commune, Iaşi County
 Mănăstirea, a village in Giulești Commune, Maramureș County
 Mănăstirea, a village in Delești Commune, Vaslui County
 Mănăstirea Cașin, a commune in Bacău County
 Mănăstirea Humorului, a commune in Suceava County
 Mănăstirea (Bârlad), a tributary of the Gârboveta in Iași County
 Mănăstirea (Râul Târgului), a tributary of the Râul Târgului in Argeș County

Mănăstire or Mânăstire also means cloister or abbey in Romanian, so every such place in Romania will be preceded by this word.

See also
Mănăstire (disambiguation)